HMS Andromeda was a 28-gun  sixth-rate frigate of the Royal Navy.  Andromeda was first Royal Navy ship commissioned by that name, in September 1777 under the command of Captain Henry Byrne. On 30 May 1778 she captured and burned American privateer brig Angelica at sea while transporting General Sir William Howe back to England. It sank off Martinique in the Great Hurricane of 1780 on 11 October 1780, killing all of the crew.

References 

 Robert Gardiner, The First Frigates, Conway Maritime Press, London 1992. .
 David Lyon, The Sailing Navy List, Conway Maritime Press, London 1993. .
 Rif Winfield, British Warships in the Age of Sail, 1714 to 1792, Seaforth Publishing, London 2007. .

External links
 
 https://www.fedex.com/fedextrack/?trknbr=285904157143&trkqual=12022~285904157143~FDEG

1777 ships
Sixth-rate frigates of the Royal Navy
Shipwrecks in the Caribbean Sea